Ernesta Di Capua (26 July 1875, Rome - 23 October 1943, Auschwitz) was an Italian botanist, taxonomist, and explorer.  She was executed at the Auschwitz concentration camp for her Jewish heritage.  The species Caralluma dicapuae was named in her honor.

References

1875 births
1943 deaths
20th-century Italian botanists
Italian women biologists
Italian people who died in Auschwitz concentration camp
20th-century Italian women scientists